This is a list of international and local organisations based in Barbados.

International organisations

Caribbean Centre of Excellence for Sustainable Livelihoods (COESL) 
Caribbean Conservation Association (CCA)
Caribbean Development Bank (CDB)
Caribbean Disaster Emergency Response Agency (CDERA)
Caribbean Examinations Council (CXC)
Caribbean Regional Environmental Programme (CREP)
Caribbean Regional Negotiating Machinery (CRNM)
Caribbean Tourism Organisation (CTO)
CARICOM Regional Organisation for Standards and Quality (CROSQ)
Caribbean Youth Environment Network (CYEN)

Local organisations

Barbados Association for Children With Intellectual Challenges
Barbados Association of Non-Governmental Organisations (BANGO)
Barbados Amateur Basketball Association (BABA)
Barbados Amateur Swimming Association (BASA)
Barbados Auto Racing League (BARL)
Barbados Bar Association (BBA)
Barbados Cancer Society (BCS)
Barbados Chamber of Commerce and Industry (BCCI)
Barbados Chess Federation (BCF)
Barbados Employers’ Confederation (BEC)
Barbados Football Association (BFA)
Barbados Hotel and Tourism Association (BHTA)
Barbados Institute of Management and Productivity (BIMAP)
Barbados International Business Association (BIBA)
Barbados Manufacturers' Association (BMA)
Barbados Olympic Association (BOA)
Barbados Sailing Association (BSA)
Barbados Squash Rackets Association (BSRA)
Institute of Chartered Accountants of Barbados (ICAB)

See also